Eupleura is a genus of sea snails, marine gastropod mollusks in the family Muricidae, the murex snails or rock snails.

Species
Species within the genus Eupleura include:

 Eupleura caudata (Say, 1822)
 Eupleura limata (Dall, 1890)
 Eupleura muriciformis (Broderip, 1833)
 Eupleura nitida (Broderip, 1833)
 Eupleura pectinata (Hinds, 1844)
 Eupleura plicata (Reeve, 1844)
 Eupleura sulcidentata (Dall, 1890)
 Eupleura tampaensis (Conrad, 1846)
 Eupleura triquetra (Reeve, 1844)
 Eupleura vokesorum (Herbert, 2005)

References

Muricidae